Thomas Andrew Minetree, M.D. is a pioneer of free-standing cancer centers. He is a thrice board-certified physician in radiation oncology, diagnostic radiology, and nuclear medicine.

Career
In 1976, with the vision of bringing big-city cancer care to small communities, Dr. Minetree founded Bethesda Cancer Centers, becoming the first private individual in the United States to open a free-standing radiation therapy cancer center. During his twenty-plus year leadership of Bethesda Cancer Treatment Centers, Dr. Minetree opened fifteen cancer centers throughout the southern and midwestern United States, providing thousands of patients with quality cancer care that was previously unavailable in their hometowns. Bethesda Cancer Centers are now owned and operated by Sonix Medical Resources, Inc., a New York Corporation.

Dr. Minetree is now retired from the practice of medicine. He and his wife, Virginia, currently enjoy spending time at their mountain ranch outside of Aspen, Colorado.  In 2008, Dr. Minetree was honored by the American Cancer Society for his contribution to oncology.

See also
Cancer Information Service (CIS)
National Cancer Institute

References

External links
Bethesda Cancer Centers
Healthgrades Physician Report
Times Daily Article on Dr. Minetree's recognition as the 2008 Honoree of the American Cancer Society

American oncologists
Living people
Year of birth missing (living people)